Branwen is a 1995 British Welsh-language drama film directed by Ceri Sherlock. The film was selected as the British entry for the Best Foreign Language Film at the 68th Academy Awards, but was not accepted as a nominee.

Summary
Branwen is a language campaigner who can speak both Welsh and Irish. She is the sister of Mathonwy, a member of the British army, and is married to Kevin, who is an IRA member. The film reveals the powerful interrelationships between love, religion, politics, the IRA and the British army.

Cast
 Morfudd Hughes as Branwen Roberts
 Richard Lynch as Kevin McCarthy
 J. O. Roberts as Y Parch / Llion Roberts
 Robert Gwyn Davin as Mathonwy Roberts
 Allin Elidyr as Peredur Roberts

See also
 List of submissions to the 68th Academy Awards for Best Foreign Language Film
 List of British submissions for the Academy Award for Best Foreign Language Film

References

External links
 

1995 films
1995 drama films
British drama films
Welsh-language films
1990s British films